An equigranular material is composed chiefly of crystals of similar orders of magnitude to one another. Basalt and gabbro commonly exhibit an equigranular texture.

Petrology